Bernardino Morra (c. 1549–1605) was a Roman Catholic prelate who served as Bishop of Aversa (1598–1605).

Biography
Morra had been Auditor of Cardinal Carlo Borromeo, Archbishop of Milan (1564–1584), and then his Vicar General.

In 1594, Morra was Apostolic Visitor of S. Lorenzo in Lucina in Rome. In 1595, he was named secretary of the SC of Bishops and Regulars.

On 9 October 1598, Bernardino Morra was appointed Bishop of Aversa by Pope Clement VIII.
On 25 October 1598 he was consecrated bishop by Ottavio Bandini, Archbishop of Fermo. At the time of his appointment, Morra was serving as secretary of the Congregation of Bishops and Regulars in the Roman Curia. His duties did not allow him to leave his post, and therefore he sent Father Giovanni Leonardi as his Administrator of the city and diocese of Aversa.

In 1600 and 1601, with the encouragement of Clement VIII, Bishop Morra reformed the cathedral Chapter of Aversa.

He served as Bishop of Aversa until his death on 17 March 1605, at the age of 56.

While bishop, he served as the principal consecrator of Andrea Sorbolonghi, Bishop of Gubbio (1600).

References

External links and additional sources

16th-century Italian Roman Catholic bishops
17th-century Italian Roman Catholic bishops
1605 deaths
Bishops appointed by Pope Gregory XIII
Bishops of Aversa
Year of birth uncertain